The New Taipei City Hall is the venue of the government of New Taipei City of the Republic of China (Taiwan). The hall is located in Banqiao District.

History
The building was constructed in 2002 as Taipei County Hall. However, after Taipei County was upgraded to city-status, the building was renamed as New Taipei City Hall.

Technical specification

The building is a 33-floor structure with a height of 140.5 meters.

There is a free observation floor for viewing on level 32 and a viewing restaurant on level 33.

Notable events
 46th Golden Horse Awards

Transportation
The building is accessible within walking distance southeast from Banqiao Station of the Taipei Metro, Taiwan High Speed Rail and Taiwan Railways Administration.

See also
 List of tallest buildings in Taiwan
 New Taipei City Council
 New Taipei City Government
 Taipei City Hall

References

External links
 

2002 establishments in Taiwan
Government buildings completed in 2002
Buildings and structures in New Taipei
City and town halls in Taiwan
Government of New Taipei
Skyscraper office buildings in New Taipei